Joshua James Cobb (born 17 August 1990) is an English cricket player. He currently plays for Northamptonshire County Cricket Club. He is a top order batsmen and occasional off-spinner. He was man of the match in the 2011 and 2016 Twenty20 finals.

Career
Cobb scored a double century for the England Under 19s. He attended Oakham School as a child, where he was a key member of the first team, averaging over 50 with the bat in his final season.

Cobb made his first team debut in 2007, aged just 17, but gained a regular place in 2008 when he scored 148 not out against Middlesex County Cricket Club at Lord's Cricket Ground, an innings which made him Leicestershire's youngest ever centurion. He is also an off spin bowler. He came to prominence at the 2011 Friends Life t20 Final against Somerset, where he won the man of the match award after scoring a crucial quick fire 18 and then taking a career best 4–22 to help restrict Somerset to 127–9 giving the Foxes the Cup by a total of 18 runs.

In July 2012, Cobb was named captain of Leicestershire's limited overs side, succeeding Matthew Hoggard. In 2013 he was named vice-captain to Ramnaresh Sarwan for Leicester's County Championship campaign.

In 2013 Joshua signed for the Dhaka Gladiators in the Bangladesh Premier League Twenty20 tournament.

He signed for Northants ahead of the 2015 season, and played an important part in their progress to the semifinal of the Twenty20 competition, as well as playing in all 16 of their County Championship matches.

The following year his first-class appearances were limited by a knee injury, but he played an important role in winning the Twenty20 title. He scored 80 off just 48 balls, as part of a 120 run fourth wicket partnership with Alex Wakely. For this he won the man of the match award in the final for the second time, the previous being with Leicestershire in 2011. Shortly before finals day, it was announced that Cobb had signed a three-year contract to continue playing for Northants.

In 2021, he was bought by the Welsh Fire in The Hundred. In the 2022 season, he was appointed captain of the team after Jonny Bairstow pulled out of the competition.

Personal life 
Cobb follows in the footsteps of his father, Russell Cobb, who was also a Leicestershire batsmen (and currently works as Head Coach at Loughborough University).

References

External links

1990 births
English expatriate sportspeople in Bangladesh
Dhaka Dominators cricketers
English cricketers
Leicestershire cricketers
Living people
Northamptonshire cricketers
Cricketers from Leicester
Central Districts cricketers
Sylhet Strikers cricketers
Prime Doleshwar Sporting Club cricketers
Welsh Fire cricketers